Johnny Hooper (born 24 June 1997) is an American water polo player who competed in the 2020 Summer Olympics.

He was born in Los Angeles to an American father and a Japanese mother. He attended University of California, Berkeley where he scored 245 goals, making him one of the highest scorers in program history.

References

External  links
 California Golden Bears bio

1997 births
Living people
Sportspeople from Los Angeles
Water polo players at the 2020 Summer Olympics
American male water polo players
Olympic water polo players of the United States
American sportspeople of Japanese descent
California Golden Bears men's water polo players
Pan American Games medalists in water polo
Pan American Games gold medalists for the United States
Water polo players at the 2019 Pan American Games
Medalists at the 2019 Pan American Games